The Chinese Taipei Figure Skating Championships is a figure skating competition held annually to determine the national champions of Taiwan (officially the Republic of China), which uses the name Chinese Taipei when participating in international sporting events. Skaters compete in the disciplines of men's singles, ladies' singles, pair skating, and ice dancing, although not every discipline is held every year due to a lack of participants. The event is organized by Chinese Taipei Skating Union, the sport's national governing body.

Senior Medalists

Men

Ladies

Pairs

Ice dance
No ice dance event held.

Junior Medalists

Men

Ladies

Advanced novice medalists

Boys

Girls

References

 2009–2010 TPE National Figure Skating Championships results
 2014–2015 TPE National Figure Skating Championships results
 2015–2016 TPE National Figure Skating Championships results

External links
 Chinese Taipei Skating Union
 TPESkating on Facebook
 TPESkating on Instagarm
 Official website(2009-2018)

 
Figure skating national championships
Figure skating in Taiwan